Eumorpha mirificatus is a moth of the  family Sphingidae. It is known from the western tip of Cuba.

It is similar to Eumorpha strenua, but has a narrower apical oblique stripe and dorsal abdominal stripe. Furthermore, there is a distinctive pinkish tone to the median area of the hindwing upperside, the upperside ground colour of the head, thorax and wings is paler olive-green.

References

Eumorpha
Moths described in 1874
Endemic fauna of Cuba